The Platinum Collection is a compilation album by German hard rock band Scorpions, released in 2005.

It is one of the band's few career-spanning sets, featuring their better-known Mercury Records material, as well as the earlier material with Ulrich Roth.

Track listing

Disc one
"In Trance" (1975) (Rudolf Schenker/Klaus Meine) - 4:42
"Crying Days" (1976) (Rudolf Schenker/Klaus Meine) - 4:37
"Pictured Life" (1977) (Rudolf Schenker/Klaus Meine/Ulrich Roth) - 3:21
"He's A Woman - She's A Man"* (1977) (Rudolf Schenker/Klaus Meine, Herman Rarebell) - 3:14
"Coast To Coast"* (1979) (Rudolf Schenker) - 4:42
"Lovedrive"* (1979) (Rudolf Schenker/Klaus Meine) - 4:51
"Is There Anybody There?"* (1979) (Rudolf Schenker/Klaus Meine, Herman Rarebell) - 4:21
"Holiday"* (1979) (Rudolf Schenker/Klaus Meine) - 6:34
"Another Piece Of Meat"* (1979) (Rudolf Schenker/Herman Rarebell) - 3:33
"Make It Real"* (1980) (Rudolf Schenker/Herman Rarebell) - 3:52
"The Zoo"* (1980) (Rudolf Schenker/Klaus Meine) - 5:31
"Hey You"* (1980) (Rudolf Schenker/Klaus Meine) - 3:48
"Blackout"* (1982) (Rudolf Schenker/Klaus Meine, Herman Rarebell, Sonia Kittelson) - 3:47
"Can't Live Without You"* (1982) (Rudolf Schenker/Klaus Meine) - 3:44
"Now!"* (1982) (Rudolf Schenker/Klaus Meine, Herman Rarebell) - 2:32
"Dynamite"* (1982) (Rudolf Schenker/Klaus Meine, Herman Rarebell) - 4:10

Disc two
"No One Like You"* (1982) (Rudolf Schenker/Klaus Meine) - 3:54
"Bad Boys Running Wild"* (1984) (Rudolf Schenker/Klaus Meine, Herman Rarebell) - 3:53
"Still Loving You" (1984) (Rudolf Schenker/Klaus Meine) - 6:08
"Big City Nights"* (1984) (Rudolf Schenker/Klaus Meine) - 4:02
"Rock You Like A Hurricane"* (1984) (Rudolf Schenker/Klaus Meine, Herman Rarebell) - 4:10
"Coming Home"* (1984) (Rudolf Schenker/Klaus Meine) - 4:58
"Rhythm of Love"* (1988) (Rudolf Schenker/Klaus Meine) - 3:48
"Believe in Love"* (1988) (Rudolf Schenker/Klaus Meine) - 4:50
"Passion Rules The Game"* (1989) (Herman Rarebell/Klaus Meine) - 3:59
"Can't Explain" (1989) (Pete Townshend) - 3:21
"Living For Tomorrow" (Live) (1992) (Rudolf Schenker/Klaus Meine) - 7:14
"Wind of Change" (1991) (Klaus Meine) - 5:10
"Send Me an Angel" (1991) (Rudolf Schenker/Klaus Meine) - 4:33
"Alien Nation" (1993) (Rudolf Schenker/Klaus Meine) - 5:43
"No Pain No Gain" (1993) (Rudolf Schenker/Klaus Meine) - 3:54
"Under the Same Sun" (Album Version) (1993) (Mark Hudson, Klaus Meine, Bruce Fairbairn) - 4:52

Disc three
"You And I" (Album Version) (1996) (Klaus Meine) - 6:13
"Does Anyone Know" (Album Version) (1996) (Klaus Meine) - 5:55
"Wild Child" (1996) (Rudolf Schenker/Klaus Meine) - 4:16
"Where The River Flows" (1997) (Rudolf Schenker/Klaus Meine) - 4:09
"Edge Of Time" (1995) (Rudolf Schenker/Klaus Meine) - 4:16
"When You Came Into My Life" (New Version) (1996) (James F. Sundah/Klaus Meine, Rudolf Schenker, Titek Puspa) - 4:23
"A Moment In A Million Years" (1999) (Klaus Meine) - 3:38
"10 Light Years Away" (1999) (Klaus Meine, M. Frederiksen, M. Jones, Rudolf Schenker) - 3:52
"Eye To Eye" (1999) (Rudolf Schenker/Klaus Meine) - 5:04
"Mysterious" (1999) (J.M. Byron, Matthias Jabs, R. Rieckermann, Rudolf Schenker/Klaus Meine) - 5:28
"Aleyah" (1999) (Rudolf Schenker/Klaus Meine) - 4:19
"Moment Of Glory" (2000) (Klaus Meine) - 5:07
"Here In My Heart" (2000) (Diane Warren) - 4:20
"When Love Kills Love" (2001) (Rudolf Schenker/Klaus Meine) - 3:38
"Deep And Dark" (2004) (Sebastian Dreher/Klaus Meine) - 3:37
"Remember The Good Times" (2004) (Retro Garage Mix) (Rudolf Schenker, Eric Bazlian/Eric Bazlian, Klaus Meine) - 4:24

'*Digital Remaster 2001

2005 compilation albums
Scorpions (band) compilation albums